PBA Rush is a 24/7 exclusive channel of Cignal, which has been currently airing games of the Philippine Basketball Association. The channel is patterned after NBA TV and was launched on July 5, 2016. The 3-year partnership agreement between Cignal and the PBA was signed on July 17, 2016, at the Smart Araneta Coliseum, 2 days after the opening of the 2016 PBA Governors' Cup.

Aside from the live telecast of the PBA games (in English commentary), other programming included in PBA Rush are same-day replays of PBA games (in mostly Tagalog commentary), games from the PBA D-League, (also in mostly Tagalog commentary) and behind-the-scenes shows such as Kuwentong Gilas. The channel currently focuses on the ongoing season and conference.

The channel is aired on Channel 90 in standard definition and Channel 260 in high definition. Some programs of PBA Rush, are also aired international on the Kapatid Channel and AksyonTV International.

Currently aired programs
PBA games*
PBA D-League games*
The Chasedown
Basketball Science
Basketball Almanac with Lourd de Veyra
Shootaround
The Huddle
StePBAck
Jumpball
Numbers
Hotseat
Fan Favorites (includes classic PBA games from 1980s to 1990s)

Special programs
The Maestro: Baby Dalupan

See also
 PBA on One Sports
 One Sports
 One Sports+
 Philippine Basketball Association
 PBA Developmental League
 Liga
 S+A
 Solar Sports
 Basketball TV

Notes
(*) also aired on Kapatid Channel (international) and AksyonTV International.

References

TV5 Network channels
Television networks in the Philippines
English-language television stations in the Philippines
Philippine Basketball Association mass media
Television channels and stations established in 2016
Sports television networks in the Philippines
Cignal TV